This is a list of the first-level administrative divisions of the People's Republic of China (P.R.C.), including all provinces, autonomous regions, special administrative regions and municipalities, in order of their natural growth rate in 2014. Here, natural growth rate refers to the birth rate minus the death rate, i.e. the effects of migration are not considered. The unit is per thousand.

The figures are from the China Statistical Yearbook 2015 published by the Bureau of Statistics of the PRC.

References
National Bureau of Statistics

Natural growth rate
Natural growth rate
China, natural growth rate